Petar Chalakov (born 15 June 1998) is a Bulgarian footballer who plays as a midfielder for Litex Lovech.

Career
Chalakov started his career at the youth ranks of Botev Plovdiv. On 17 September 2016, he made his professional debut for the club in a 4–0 home win over Lokomotiv Gorna Oryahovitsa, coming on as substitute for Felipe Brisola. On 16 June 2017, he was loaned to Maritsa Plovdiv.

In July 2018, Chalakov joined Lokomotiv Gorna Oryahovitsa.

References

External links

Living people
1998 births
Bulgarian footballers
Association football midfielders
Botev Plovdiv players
FC Maritsa Plovdiv players
FC Lokomotiv Gorna Oryahovitsa players
First Professional Football League (Bulgaria) players
Second Professional Football League (Bulgaria) players